Indrek Zelinski (born 13 November 1974) is an Estonian football coach and former professional player.

Zelinski played as a forward for Sindi Kalju, Tervis Pärnu, Pärnu Kalev, Flora, Lelle, Kuressaare, Lahti, AaB, Landskrona BoIS, Frem and Levadia. Zelinski made his international debut for the Estonia national team in 1994. He made 103 appearances for the team, scoring 27 goals, before retiring in 2010. Zelinski was named Estonian Footballer of the Year in 2001, and won the Estonian Silverball award three times, in 2000, 2003 and 2007.

Early life
Born in Pärnu, Zelinski started playing football in 1985 for his hometown club Pärnu Kalev's youth team under the coach Märt Siigur.

Club career

Flora
In 1993, Zelinski signed for Flora. He saw limited playing time during the 1993–94 season, but scored a hat-trick in the championship play-off match against Norma, earning his first trophy. Zelinski spent his first seasons in Flora mostly playing for Flora affiliated teams Lelle, Tervis Pärnu and Kuressaare. He became a Flora's first team regular in the 1995–96 season. Zelinski won his second Meistriliiga title with Flora in the 1997–98 season and a third one in the following 1998 season.

On 29 July 1999, Flora reached an agreement with English side Blackpool for the transfer of Zelinski, but the move was foiled by work permit issues.

Lahti (loan)
On 2 December 1999, Zelinski joined Finnish Veikkausliiga side Lahti on loan. Zelinski returned to Flora after the one-year loan spell in October 2000.

AaB
On 17 July 2001, Zelinski joined Danish Superliga side AaB on loan until 9 December 2001 for a fee of EEK 1.3 million. The move was made permanent on 4 August 2001 for a fee of EEK 4 million. At Aab, Zelinski formed a strike partnership with fellow Estonian international Andres Oper. Zelinski scored 13 goals in the 2001–02 season and was the team's top goalscorer in the league. Despite that, we was dropped by the new manager Poul Erik Andreasen, and subsequently loaned to Landskrona BoIS and Frem.

Levadia
In January 2005, Zelinski returned to Estonia as a free agent and signed a two-year contract with Levadia. He was Levadia's top goalscorer in the league for three consecutive seasons from 2005 to 2007, and won four consecutive Meistriliiga titles in 2006, 2007, 2008, and 2009. In August 2009, Zelinski announced that he will almost certainly retire from professional football at the end of the season. He played his last match in the Meistriliiga on 10 November 2009 against Paide Linnameeskond, where he was sent off in the end of the first half for a professional foul.

International career
Zelinski made his international debut for the Estonia national team on 7 May 1994 in a 0–4 away defeat against United States in a friendly. He scored his first goal for Estonia on 13 November 1996 in a 6–1 away win against Andorra. Three days later, on 16 November 1996, Zelinski scored a hat-trick against Indonesia in a friendly. Zelinski was named Estonian Footballer of the Year in 2001, and won the Estonian Silverball award three times, in 2000, 2003 and 2007. He ended his international career with a testimonial match on 21 May 2010, after a 2–0 home win against Finland, having made 103 appearances and scoring 27 goals.

Personal life
Zelinski has a daughter, Johanna-Lisa (born 2000), with his girlfriend Sigrit Järvamägi who is a two-time Estonian Women's Cup winner with Flora women's team.

Career statistics

Club

International

International goals
Estonia score listed first, score column indicates score after each Zelinski goal.

Honours

Club
Flora
 Meistriliiga: 1993–94, 1997–98, 1998
 Estonian Cup: 1997–98
 Estonian Supercup: 1998

Levadia
 Meistriliiga: 2006, 2007, 2008, 2009
 Estonian Cup: 2004–05, 2006–07

Individual
 Estonian Footballer of the Year: 2001
 Estonian Silverball: 2000, 2003, 2007
UEFA awards 100 caps: 2011

See also 
 List of men's footballers with 100 or more international caps

References

External links

Levadia profile 
 
Frem profile  

1974 births
Living people
Sportspeople from Pärnu
Estonian footballers
Estonia international footballers
Estonia under-21 international footballers
Esiliiga players
FC Flora players
Meistriliiga players
FCI Levadia Tallinn players
FIFA Century Club
Estonian expatriate footballers
Veikkausliiga players
FC Lahti players
AaB Fodbold players
Boldklubben Frem players
Landskrona BoIS players
Expatriate footballers in Finland
Estonian expatriate sportspeople in Finland
Expatriate men's footballers in Denmark
Estonian expatriate sportspeople in Denmark
Danish Superliga players
Danish 1st Division players
Expatriate footballers in Sweden
Estonian expatriate sportspeople in Sweden
Allsvenskan players
Estonian football managers
Association football forwards
FCI Levadia U21 players
FCI Levadia U21 managers
FC Kuressaare players
Estonian expatriate football managers
Pärnu JK Vaprus managers